Alcanivorax dieselolei is a species of alkane-degrading bacteria. Its genome has been sequenced. It is halophilic, aerobic, Gram-negative, non-spore-forming, catalase- and oxidase-positive, motile and rod-shaped. Its type strain is B-5T (=DSM 16502T =CGMCC 1.3690T).

References

Further reading

External links

LPSN
WORMS entry
Type strain of Alcanivorax dieselolei at BacDive -  the Bacterial Diversity Metadatabase

Oceanospirillales
Biodegradation
Bacteria described in 2005